Ida Lewis may refer to:
Ida Lewis (1842–1911), an American lighthouse keeper.
Ida Lewis (actress) (1848–1935), American actress
Ida E. Lewis (1934- ), Black journalist and author
Julia Arthur (1868–1950), Canadian-born actress born as Ida Lewis